Walker Glacier is an attenuated glacier flowing northeast in Caffin Valley closely following the west side of Gibson Spur, in the Willett Range of Victoria Land. The glacier terminates at Barwick Valley short of reaching the southern flank of the Webb Glacier.  It was named by the New Zealand Geographic Board in 2005 after Barry Walker, a geologist with Victoria University's Antarctic Expeditions to this area, 1979–80, 1981–82, and 1982–83; field leader for basement geology studies at Mount Bastion.

References

Glaciers of Victoria Land
Walker